Michael Esser (born 22 November 1987) is a German professional footballer who plays as a goalkeeper for Bundesliga club VfL Bochum.

Career statistics

References

External links
 
 

1987 births
Living people
People from Castrop-Rauxel
Sportspeople from Münster (region)
German footballers
Footballers from North Rhine-Westphalia
Association football goalkeepers
Bundesliga players
2. Bundesliga players
Regionalliga players
Landesliga players
Austrian Football Bundesliga players
VfL Bochum players
VfL Bochum II players
SK Sturm Graz players
SV Darmstadt 98 players
Hannover 96 players
TSG 1899 Hoffenheim players
German expatriate footballers
German expatriate sportspeople in Austria
Expatriate footballers in Austria